Rimëkëmbja  (meaning the Recovery in English) is an Albanian language newspaper published in Albania.

Profile
Rimëkëmbja is owned by Abdi Baleta who is a member of the Party of the National Recovery (Rimëkëmbja Kombëtare in Albanian).

References

Party newspapers published in Albania
Albanian-language newspapers